Allmendinger is a surname. Notable people with the surname include:

A. J. Allmendinger (born 1981), American racing driver
Ernest Allmendinger (1890–1973), American football player
Jutta Allmendinger, German social scientist
Karl Allmendinger (1891–1965), German World War II general